The 2010 African Women's Handball Championship was the 19th edition of the African Women's Handball Championship, organized by the African Handball Confederation, which acted as the qualification process for the 2011 World Women's Handball Championship. It was held in Cairo and Suez Egypt between 10 and 21 February 2010.

Teams

Preliminary round
All times are local (UTC+2).

Group A

Group B

Ranking round

Placement matches

Seventh place play-off

Fifth place play-off

Final round

Quarterfinals

Semifinals

Third place play-off

Final

Final standings

Awards

See also
2010 African Women's Handball Champions League

References

Goalzz.com: Women African Championship Handball in Egypt 2010

External links
todor66.com

African Women's Handball Championship
Women's Handball Championship
African Women's Championship
Sports competitions in Cairo
African handball championships
February 2010 sports events in Africa
Women's handball in Egypt
International handball competitions hosted by Egypt
2010 in African women's sport